Rhipsalis oblonga is a species of plant in the family Cactaceae. It is endemic to Brazil.  Its natural habitat is subtropical or tropical moist lowland forests. It is threatened by habitat loss.

References

oblonga
Endemic flora of Brazil
Near threatened plants
Taxonomy articles created by Polbot